A chord is a concurrency construct available in Polyphonic C♯ and Cω inspired by the join pattern of the join-calculus.  A chord is a function body that is associated with multiple function headers and cannot execute until all function headers are called.

Synchronicity 
Cω defines two types of functions synchronous and asynchronous.  A synchronous function acts like a standard function in most Object-Oriented Language, upon invocation the function body is executed and a return value may or may not be returned to the caller.  An asynchronous function acts similar to a function that returns void except that it is guaranteed to return immediately with the execution being done in a separate thread.

References

Concurrency (computer science)